or , also anglicized Ben Sgriol, is the highest mountain on the Glenelg peninsula in the Northwest Highlands of Scotland. The main approach is via Arnisdale on the shores of Loch Hourn or via Gleann Beag to the north, with its well-known brochs. The view from the summit was described by Sir Hugh Munro, a founder member of the Scottish Mountaineering Club, as "perhaps the most beautiful I have seen in Scotland".

Classification
Mountains in the British Isles are classified according to height. It is the highest mountain on the Glenelg peninsula, an area of largely uninhabited land bounded by Loch Alsh and Loch Duich to the north and by Loch Hourn to the west and south.

Geography and geology
Beinn Sgritheall consists of a narrow, curved crest running parallel to the north shore of Loch Hourn from which several ridges extend. It has three tops: the summit, a Middle Top (also 974 metres) and an East Top. The upper parts of its west face consist of crags and scree. The north and eastern part of the mountain contain a number of remote corries. Two ridges run north-east from the summit with one curving north-west to enclose a high corrie. A third ridge runs west to Creag an Taghain, a crag above the forest of Coille Mhialairigh.

The view from the summit encompasses: the isles of Jura, Rùm and Mull; the mountains of Knoydart, Skye and Moidart; Ben Nevis and Slioch; and the ridges of Glen Affric and Glen Shiel. It is possible to see more than 100 named peaks from the summit and Hamish Brown would not swap the view from it "for any mountain view in the world".

The rock of Beinn Sgritheall is of the schistose type.

Climbing
Beinn Sgritheall is commonly climbed from the village of Arnisdale on the shores of Loch Hourn. An alternative is to approach via Gleann Beag to the north, with its well-known brochs. Both starting points can only be accessed either overland via a single lane road from Glen Shiel, or across the waters of Loch Hourn using a ferry or boat.

It is possible to complete a number of traverses. One example approaches from the south-west side of the mountain, gaining the west ridge via the forest of Coille Mhialairigh.

References
 
 
 

Munros
Marilyns of Scotland
Mountains and hills of the Northwest Highlands
Mountains and hills of Highland (council area)